Bokermannohyla sagarana is a species of frog in the family Hylidae, endemic to southeastern Brazil.

The adult male frog measures 47.3–54.8 mm in snout-vent length and the adult female frog 44.5–48.6 mm. The skin of the dorsum is gray in color with dark gray blotches on a light gray background, which scientists liken to the appearance of lichen on rock. The forelegs are hypertrophied. The hind legs are light in color with strikingly dark bars across.

References

Amphibians described in 2011
Endemic fauna of Brazil
Frogs of South America
sagarana